Live Hard is the third extended play by American hip hop duo Showbiz and A.G. It was released in late 2007 through D.I.T.C. Records. Recording sessions took place at Headqcourterz Studios in New York. Production was handled by Born Lords (Showbiz and E-Blaze). It features contributions from O.C. and DJ Premier.

Released under the name The Show & A Experience, the EP is the first material the duo has recorded together since 1998's Full Scale and is supposed to be a prelude to an upcoming full-length album. The album was re-released in 2008 on CD and limited 2xLP featuring a remixed version of "Land Of The Free" featuring the same lyrics but with a new beat from Show.

Track listing

References

External links

2007 EPs
Showbiz and A.G. albums
Diggin' in the Crates Crew
Albums produced by Showbiz (producer)